Erbessa dominula is a moth of the family Notodontidae first described by William Warren in 1909. It is found in Argentina, Uruguay and Brazil.

References

Moths described in 1909
Notodontidae of South America